The 1996 Finnish Masters was an invitational non-ranking snooker tournament held in Finland in 1996. Rod Lawler won the tournament defeating Stefan Mazrocis 6–2 in the final.

Results

References

1996 in snooker
Sport in Finland